Kenken may refer to:

 KenKen puzzle
 KenKen, Japanese musician and bassist of the band Rize
 Kenken (bell), of Kouroussa in northwestern Guinea